Jerzy Sapieyevski (born Jerzy Sapiejewski in Łódź, 20 March 1945), is a Polish-born pianist, composer, educator and conductor who settled in the United States in 1967.

Career
Jerzy Sapieyevski was born in Łódź and began music and engineering studies in his native Poland and settled in the USA 1967.  A triple laureate of "Jazz nad Odrą" festivals/competitions (1964, 1965, and 1966) completed his music degrees in the United States.  In 1968 he received a scholarship from the Koussevitzky Foundation and participated as a pianist and composer at the Tanglewood Music Festival. In the following year he worked as an assistant at the Catholic University of America and in 1971 he was a finalist at an international conducting competition in France. For a while he was married to Anne Lindbergh, some of whose poems he set to music in 1979.

Sapieyevski's music blends popular and classical styles and he has experimented with interactive works, in which electronic instruments were featured, including collaborations in live performances with painters – “Painted Music”.  In 2001 Sapieyevski foresaw a need for remote collaborations of multimedia artists/performers and music instructions. He designed Method of Multiple Computers Synchronization and Control for Guiding Spatially Dispersed Life Music/Multimedia Performances.

In 2005 the composer was decorated with the Knight Cross of the Order of Merit of the Republic of Poland.  Sapieyevski’s commissions and performances included the Kennedy Center and the Library of Congress commission and premiere of “Mazurka Variations” based on a Polish folk song.

His classical concert music scores are held in many libraries through the world.  His score for the Washington Shakespeare Theatre's Production of "Richard III" was nominated for 1991 Helen Hayes Award.

As an educator he has utilized music as a powerful communicator: “For many, music may prove to be the best creative and emotional outlet. Especially, in the midst of a world that is riddled with rhetoric, music provides the refreshing elements of a direct, non-verbal communication. Music offers a sanctuary for one’s diverse personal experiences and emotions. It is shown to improve intellectual and spiritual functionality. Music is universally unifying, and it can profoundly mitigate stressors, cultural biases and social divisions. It is devoid of rhetoric. In combination with the grasp of other disciplines, live music creates a lasting fulfillment and genuinely interpersonal experience.” 

In 2018 he established AmericanSongClub® to promote talent development, social understanding and cultural interaction through workshops and performances of time-honored American music.  From 2018 – 2021 Sapieyevski litigated (pro se) alleged infringement of his trademark (MusicHappens®) by Live Nation Entertainment, Inc.

Currently he is Professor Emeritus at American University in Washington, DC.

Compositions
 1971 Lament for Igor Stravinsky
 1973 Sinfonia Americana
 1974 Concerto for viola and winds
 1975 Morpheus: wind symphony
 1976 Aria for alto saxophone and string ensemble
 1977 Trio for an Italian journey : violin, cello, piano
 1977 Summer overture: for orchestra
 1978 Concerto for trumpet and orchestra ("Mercury")
 1979 Love Songs (to poems by Anne Lindbergh) for soprano and piano 
 1980 Carolina concerto for flute and oboe
 1981 Aria: for flute and strings or piano
 1981 Games for Brass and Percussion 
 1981 Scherzo di Concerto for Wind Ensemble
 1982 Toada in memory of Heitor Villa-Lobos: for clarinet and piano, commissioned by the Delmar Foundation for the Dumbarton Concerts
 1984 Aesop suite: for brass quintet and narrator, commissioned by the Annapolis Brass Quintet
 1986 Mazurka: variations for string quartet, commissioned by the Library of Congress 
 1989 Arioso for trumpet and woodwind quintet, commissioned by The International Trumpet Guild
 1990 Carolina Concerto for flute and oboe
 1990 Dance of the Planets, for orchestra and synthesizer
 1992 Echoes of the spirit, for synthesizer and organ
 1992 "Songs of the Rose", for synthesizer, chorus and African drum
 1995 New Century Music, for electronic instruments
 1996 Illuminata, commissioned by the Washington Ballet,
 1997 Clio's Triumph, commissioned by the Washington Ballet
 2004 Concerto, for solo piano and computer
 2006 Painted Music, for orchestra and painters

References

1945 births
Polish emigrants to the United States
Polish composers
American University faculty and staff
20th-century American pianists
20th-century American male musicians
21st-century American musicians
21st-century American composers
Living people